Kakata District is one of four districts located in Margibi County, Liberia. Kakata, the capital city of Margibi County, is located in the district.

References

Districts of Liberia
Margibi County